Sissel Sofie Grottenberg (born 17 August 1956 in Sarpsborg, Østfold) is a retired Norwegian long-distance runner who specialized in the marathon race and half marathon.

In the marathon she finished 36th at the 1988 Summer Olympics, seventh at the 1990 European Championships and sixteenth at the 1991 World Championships. She became Norwegian champion in half marathon in the years 1989-1992. In addition she won the 1500 m in 1988 and in 5000 m in 2000.

Personal bests
5000 metres - 16:08.41 min (1986)
10,000 metres - 32:54.84 min (1987) - eighth among Norwegian 10,000 m runners.
Half marathon - 1:11:46 hrs (1988) - seventh among Norwegian half marathon runners.
Marathon - 2:32:57 hrs (1987) - sixth among Norwegian marathon runners.

Achievements
All results regarding marathon, unless stated otherwise

References

External links
sports-reference

1956 births
Living people
Norwegian female long-distance runners
Athletes (track and field) at the 1988 Summer Olympics
Olympic athletes of Norway
Frankfurt Marathon female winners
Norwegian female marathon runners